Maubeuge is a railway station serving the town Maubeuge, Nord department, northern France. It is situated on the Creil–Jeumont railway.

Services

The station is served by regional trains to Aulnoye-Aymeries, Valenciennes, Saint-Quentin, Charleroi and Lille.

References

Railway stations in Nord (French department)
Railway stations in France opened in 1855
Gare de Maubeuge